Marioara Constantin (born 13 November 1951) is a Romanian rower. She competed in the women's eight event at the 1976 Summer Olympics.

References

External links
 
 
 

1951 births
Living people
Romanian female rowers
Olympic rowers of Romania
Rowers at the 1976 Summer Olympics
Place of birth missing (living people)